Donovan Ward (born November 1962 in Western Cape, Cape Town, South Africa) is a South African artist who works in several media, including painting and sculpture.

Donovan's work is represented in private and public collections including the University of South Africa, Pretoria,and the Durban Art Gallery. Public Art commissions include  the Gugulethu 7 memorial commissioned by the City of Cape Town and Provincial Government and the United Democratic Front Memorial.

External links
 Extensive Bio

South African artists
1956 births
Living people
Artists from Cape Town